The Campeonato Catarinense Série B  is the second tier of football league of the state of Santa Catarina, Brazil.

Participants
2022 edition

List of champions

Segunda Divisão

Divisão Intermediária

Série B

Notes

Caçadorense is the currently SE Kindermann who competes at the women's level.
CFZ Imbituba is the currently Imbituba FC.

Titles by team 

Teams in bold still active.

By city

References

 
Catarinense